Howrah or Haora, is one of the largest cities in West Bengal, India. Many notable people is born or associated with this city. This is a list of notable people who lived in or came from Howrah. A name can repeat in the following sections.

Writers
 Mani Shankar Mukherjee, well known for his book on Swami Vivekananda
Purnendu Pattrea, writer
 Muhammad Shahidullah, famous writer
 Sandipan Chattopadhyay, famous for his book Kritadas Kritadasi
 Sankari Prasad Basu, famous for his books on Swami Vivekananda, Sahashya Vivekananda and Bandhu Vivekananda
 Sarat Chandra Chattopadhyay, Bengali novelist and short story writer

Educationists
 Kanailal Bhattacharyya, ex-minister of Ministry of Commerce and Indrustries, West Bengal
 Kedarnath Bhattacharya, created first vernacular Bengali medium school of Howrah Santragachi Minor School
 Mahesh Chandra Nyayratna Bhattacharyya, scholar of Sanskrit, and the former principal of the Sanskrit College between 1876 and 1895
 Muhammad Shahidullah, linguist, writer and philologist
 Sanghamitra Bandyopadhyay, Computer Scientist, Director Indian Statistical Institute
 Suniti Kumar Chatterji, Indian linguist, educationist, litterateur, got Padma Bhushan award

Doctors
 Mahendralal Sarkar, founder of the Indian Association for the Cultivation of Science
 Jagannath Bhattacharya, physicist

People associated with films and Television
 Anjana Basu, television actress
 Ayaz Ahmed, television actor
 Bidita Bag, television actress
 Bibhu Bhattacharya, actor
 Hiran Chatterjee, actor, producer, singer
 Kanan Devi, the first star actress of Bengali cinema
 N. K. Salil, film actor
 Purnendu Pattrea, film director
 Raviranjan Maitra, film actor, producer and editor
 Rudranil Ghosh, film actor
 Sayani Datta, actress
 Soumitra Chatterjee, film actor
 Sisir Bhaduri, film actor and director
 Sujan Mukhopadhyay, film actor
 Suman Mukhopadhyay, director and film-maker
 Tulsi Chakraborty, actor

Singers
 Bharatchandra Ray, known for his poetic work, Annadamangal or Annapurnamangal
 Dilip Bagchi, mass singer 
 Juthika Roy, awarded with Padma Shri
Koushik Bhattacharjee, classical vocalist
Sagarika Mukherjee Da Costa, singer, songwriter and actress
 Tarun Bhattacharya, classical musician

Politicians
 Ambica Banerjee, Member of the West Bengal Legislative Assembly
 Arup Roy, cabinet minister of West Bengal since 2011 and also an MLA
 Kanailal Bhattacharyya, ex-minister of Ministry of Commerce and Indrustries, West Bengal
 Kedarnath Bhattacharya, first elected vice-chairman of Howrah Municipal Corporation
 Hannan Mollah, member of Lok Sabha of India from the 7th Lok Sabha to the 14th Lok Sabha
 Jagannath Bhattacharya, politician
 Jatu Lahiri, member of West Bengal Legislative Assembly
 Swapan Sadhan Bose, politician
 Swadesh Chakraborty, politician

Business people
 Alamohan Das, industrialist

Sports
Aloke Bhattacharjee, cricketer and umpire
Bikash Chowdhury, first-class cricketer
Charanjit Singh, first-class cricketer
Dibyendu Chakrabarty, first-class cricketer
Gitimoy Basu, first-class Indian cricketer
Jolly Sarkar, first-class cricketer
 Harold Denham, English cricketer
 Laxmi Ratan Shukla, first class Indian cricketer
 Manoj Tiwary, Indian cricketer, played for the Kings XI Punjab and Kolkata Knight Riders in Indian Premier League
 Pritam Chakraborty, first-class cricketer, U-19 Indian Cricket Team
Rabin Das, footballer, played for Mohun Bagan
 Saurasish Lahiri, Indian cricketer, played in the international
 Sailen Manna, footballer, played for the Mohun Bagan team and played in international competitions including the Asian Games and Olympics
Soumik Chatterjee, first-class cricketer
Sanjib Sanyal, first-class cricketer
 Shyama Shaw, international cricketer, left hand batsman, played test and one-day matches
Sudip Chatterjee, international football player

Artists
Kalipada Ghoshal, last successor of Abanindranath Tagore's Indian Society of Oriental Art and Bengal school of art 
 Rabin Mondal, founding member of the Calcutta Painters

Others
K. C. Paul, conspiracy theorist, self-proclaimed scientist and astronomer
N. K. Salil, film screenplay and story writer
Narayan Debnath, popular comic artist 
Subhas Datta, environment activist
Subroto Mukherjee, first air marshal of Indian Air Force

References

People from Howrah
Howrah